Lefton is a surname. Notable people with the surname include:

Lester Lefton (born 1946), American psychologist and academic administrator
Melissa Lefton (born 1975), American singer-songwriter and comedian

See also
Leyton (surname)
Lofton